Sitaq (Quechua, Hispanicized spelling Citac) is a mountain in the Chunta mountain range in the Andes of Peru, about  high. It is located in the Huancavelica Region, Huancavelica Province, on the border of the districts Acobambilla and Nuevo Occoro. The ridge of Sitaq, formed like a semicircle, lies west of the lake Tipiqucha.

References

Mountains of Peru
Mountains of Huancavelica Region